William F. Downes (born 1946) is a retired United States district judge of the United States District Court for the District of Wyoming.

Education and career

Born in Boston, Massachusetts, Downes received a Bachelor of Arts degree from the University of North Texas in 1968 and served in the United States Marine Corps from 1968 to 1971. He received a Juris Doctor from the University of Houston Law Center in 1974. He was in private practice in Green River, Wyoming from 1975 to 1978 and in Casper, Wyoming from 1978 to 1994.

Federal judicial service

On May 5, 1994, Downes was nominated by President Bill Clinton to a new seat on the United States District Court for the District of Wyoming created by 104 Stat. 5089. He was confirmed by the United States Senate on June 15, 1994, and received his commission on June 16, 1994. He became chief judge in 1999 and retired in 2011. His official portrait was painted by artist Michele Rushworth and hangs in the federal courthouse in Cheyenne, Wyoming.

References
  

1946 births
Living people
Judges of the United States District Court for the District of Wyoming
People from Boston
United States district court judges appointed by Bill Clinton
United States Marines
University of Houston Law Center alumni
University of North Texas alumni
People from Casper, Wyoming
20th-century American judges
21st-century American judges